Side Trax is a compilation album from industrial metal band Ministry. The album was released in October 2004.  It compiles EPs from four Ministry side projects recorded in the late 1980s: Pailhead, 1000 Homo DJs, PTP, and Acid Horse. All of the songs were originally released on Wax Trax! Records, with the exception of PTP's previously-unreleased "Show Me Your Spine."  Notably, the rare version of 1000 Homo DJs' "Supernaut" with Trent Reznor of Nine Inch Nails on vocals is included on this compilation.

The first pressing of the album was afflicted with poor sound quality, which was caused by the simple duplication of the left channel. Later pressings corrected the mistakes. The original mono pressing has the digits A4 P2 310690-2 01 on the back, while the corrected stereo version has the digits A4 P2 310690-2 RE-1 01. It is also confirmed that albums ordered direct from Ryko will be the corrected pressing.

Track listing

Pailhead

1000 Homo DJs

PTP

Acid Horse

References

2004 compilation albums
Albums produced by Al Jourgensen
Ministry (band) albums
Rykodisc compilation albums